Bartolomé de Medina, O.P. (1527-1580) was a Spanish theologian born in Medina de Rioseco, Spain. A member of the Dominican Order and a student of Francisco de Vitoria, he was professor of theology at the University of Salamanca and a member of the School of Salamanca. He is best known as the originator of the doctrine of probabilism in moral theology, which holds that one may follow a course of action that has some probability, even if the opposite is more probable. He died at Salamanca in 1581.

References
 
 J. Franklin, The Science of Conjecture: Evidence and Probability Before Pascal (Baltimore: Johns Hopkins University Press, 2001), 74–76.

1527 births
1581 deaths
People from Medina de Rioseco
Spanish Dominicans
16th-century Spanish Roman Catholic theologians
University of Salamanca alumni
Academic staff of the University of Salamanca
16th-century Spanish philosophers
School of Salamanca